Summer school (or summer university) is a school, or a program generally sponsored by a school or a school district, or provided by a private company, that provides lessons and activities during the summer vacation. Participation in summer schools has been shown to have substantial beneficial effects on education.

Summer schools in North America
In elementary and middle school, these programs are often used for remedial instruction, though some non-academic day camp programs call themselves Summer school.

In high school, college or university, students can enroll in classes for credit to be taken into account in their grade point average or their transcript. Generally, this credit is in one of two categories: remediation or advancement. For remediation, the summer school is used to make up credits lost through absence or failure. For advancement, the summer school is used to obtain credit for classes to accelerate progress toward a degree or to lessen the load of courses during the regular school year. Many universities offer short-term summer courses to attract both local and international students, and these programs are often surrounded by social activities.

In academia, the term can also refer to a type of conference. Typically, established academics will give presentations on advanced topics in a field to postgraduate students. This type of summer school is often organized at a national or international level, and no credits are awarded. Also, a college or university sometimes offers a summer program for teachers or other professional workers wishing to round out their professional or general education.
Some summer schools are for the general public involving no examinations and are not for degree purposes.

Summer schools internationally
Outside North America, the term has a broader definition and refers to all ages and includes leisure and other non-academic subjects, so, for example, a course on hedge-laying is probably targeting older adults. In these regions, Music Summer Schools, on the other hand, may be designed for school age students, college students, or adult professionals or amateurs at various levels of attainment.

Summer schools can also provide students with educational experiences that would not be available to them within their normal schooling. This may encompass subjects that are not conventionally offered in schools (such as law, which is not usually offered in UK schools but may be taught in summer schools), or the experience of studying in an ancient university or a university or college that has a strong reputation on the global stage, such as the University of Oxford. Summer schools may also incorporate a wider variety of excursions and fields trips than would be possible in day-to-day education, so that some summer schools straddle the line between education and holiday.

English as a foreign language
Summer schools are a popular choice for students of English as a Foreign Language, particularly children. EnglishUK, the language teaching organisation for EFL in the UK, has more than 470 members, many of which operate summer schools. Summer schools often offer foreign language immersion, which has known benefits for language learning. Summer schools of this kind also hold appeal for students wishing to pursue higher education in English-speaking countries, which consistently top university league tables and get a high percentage of their students from overseas, as summer schools in these countries provide insight not only into the English language, but also into the cultures that use it. They may even provide guidance for such students in their university applications.

See also
Cram school
Special education
Summer camp
Summer learning loss
California State Summer School for Mathematics and Science
California State Summer School for the Arts
Catholic Summer School of America
Dartington International Summer School, UK
Harvard Summer School
Junior State of America Summer School
International Summer University (ISU) Kassel, Germany
International Winter University (IWU) Kassel, Germany
London School of Economics, UK
LITE Regal International School, UK
National Science Summer School Inc.
Queen Maeve International Summer School
Rabb School of Summer and Continuing Studies
Transitional Justice Institute Summer School on Transitional Justice
Utrecht Summer School
Willie Clancy Summer School
List of summer schools of linguistics
List of summer schools of nature sciences
Year-round school in the United States

References

Further reading
 Cooper, Harris; Charlton, Kelly; Valentine, Jeff C.; Muhlenbruck, Laura: Making the Most of Summer School: A Meta-Analytic and Narrative Review. Monographs of the Society for Research in Child Development, v65 n1 p1-118 2000. . Blackwell Publishing, 2000.
 Guide to Summer Camps and Summer Schools. 31st edition, 2008/09. Porter Sargent Handbooks, a Division of Alloy Education.
 Guide to Summer Camps and Summer Schools. 32nd edition, 2010/11. Porter Sargent Handbooks, a Division of Alloy Education.

External links
Summer Schools and Summer Courses UK Directory

School types
School